The Suan Dusit Art Gallery is operated by Suan Dusit University. It is on the university's Dusit District, Bangkok, Thailand campus.

References

Museums in Bangkok
Art museums and galleries in Thailand